Hinterweidenthal is a municipality in Südwestpfalz district, in Rhineland-Palatinate, western Germany.

References

Municipalities in Rhineland-Palatinate
Palatinate Forest
South Palatinate
Südwestpfalz